The Metropolitan Museum of Art holds a 16th-century combination weapon in its armaments collection. The weapon is an 89 3/4 inch boar spear with two wheellock pistol barrels fused to both flat sides of the spear's head; the intent of this design was to provide the wielder with the extra stopping power of two .41 caliber musket balls that could be fired at targets out of the reach of the spear. Some sources posit that such weapons were instead experimental pieces or curiosities. The 9 lb, German-made weapon was donated to the Met's collection by the Roger's fund in 1904.

Gallery

References 

Arms and armor of the Metropolitan Museum of Art
Combination weapons
Individual firearms
1575 works